"Piece of My Heart" is a 1993 song by German Eurodance project Intermission. Written by Nosie Katzmann and Tony Dawson-Harrison from Captain Hollywood Project, it was released as the second single from the album by same name (1994). It features vocals by American singer Valerie Scott and uses the interpolated melody of the 1983 song "Send Me An Angel" by Australian band Real Life. The single was a major hit in Europe, peaking within the Top 10 in Austria, Germany and Spain. It spent 12 weeks on the German singles chart. Additionally, it reached number 40 in Switzerland and number 42 in Belgium. On the Eurochart Hot 100, it peaked at number 33 in January 1994. Outside Europe, it was a hit also in Israel, peaking at number 11 in September 1993. A music video was made to accompany the song. In 2003, trance music duo Grey & Frost updated "Piece of My Heart" into a modern hard trance sound.

Track listing

Charts

Weekly charts

Year-end charts

References

 

1993 singles
1993 songs
Blow Up singles
English-language German songs
Eurodance songs
House music songs
Songs written by Nosie Katzmann